Kenneth Duncan McRae (born April 23, 1968) is a Canadian professional ice hockey coach and former player. McRae is the former head coach of the Peterborough Petes of the Ontario Hockey League. McRae is also a former right wing who played 137 games in the National Hockey League (NHL) with the Quebec Nordiques and Toronto Maple Leafs. He was drafted by the Nordiques in the first round, 18th overall, in the 1986 NHL Entry Draft.

Playing career
Born in Winchester, Ontario, McRae played his junior hockey with the Sudbury Wolves and Hamilton Steelhawks from 1984–88, where he was a highly touted prospect. The Quebec Nordiques drafted McRae in the first round of the 1986 NHL Entry Draft, and he appeared in his first NHL game with the team in the 1987–88 season. McRae played in 126 with the Nordiques before being traded to the Toronto Maple Leafs on July 21, 1992 for Len Esau.

McRae only played 11 games with Toronto from 1992–94, as he spent most of his time in the American Hockey League (AHL) with the St. John's Maple Leafs and McRae spent the remainder of his career in the AHL and the International Hockey League (IHL). McRae ended his career with 137 NHL games, scoring 14 goals and 21 assists for 35 points, and 364 penalty minutes.

Coaching career
Upon his retirement from playing, McRae became an assistant coach with the Austin Ice Bats of the Western Professional Hockey League. McRae then became the head coach of the Indianapolis Ice of the Central Hockey League in 2002, as he led the Ice to the best record in the Northeast Division with a 39–16–9 record in the 2002–03 season before losing in the second round of the playoffs. McRae was named CHL coach of the year for 2002-03. McRae returned to Indianapolis in 2003–04, as the team had a 37–23–4 record, finishing in second in the Northeast, however, the team lost in the first round of the playoffs.

From 2004–08, McRae was the head coach of the Corpus Christi Rayz, as he led the team to a 106–116–28 record in his four years with the team. His best season with the Rayz was in 2006–07, as the team had a 35–22–7 record.

In the summer of 2008, the Peterborough Petes of the Ontario Hockey League hired McRae to become their new head coach. On March 31, 2010 it was announced that McRae's contract as head coach of the Petes would not be renewed.

Career statistics

Coaching record

References

External links

1968 births
Canadian ice hockey right wingers
Canadian people of Scottish descent
Detroit Vipers players
Fredericton Express players
Halifax Citadels players
Hamilton Steelhawks players
Houston Aeros (1994–2013) players
Ice hockey people from Ontario
Living people
National Hockey League first-round draft picks
People from the United Counties of Stormont, Dundas and Glengarry
Phoenix Roadrunners (IHL) players
Providence Bruins players
Quebec Nordiques draft picks
Quebec Nordiques players
St. John's Maple Leafs players
Sudbury Wolves players
Toronto Maple Leafs players